Nermin Bašić (born 24 November 1983) is a Bosnian professional football manager who was most recently the manager of Slovenian PrvaLiga side Radomlje.

He is the youngest ever manager that has managed in the Bosnian Premier League, and was the youngest Bosnian manager to have a UEFA Pro Licence at the time.

During his career, Bašić has managed Bosnian clubs Tuzla City, Travnik and Metalleghe-BSI, and Slovenian clubs Radomlje and Gorica.

With Metalleghe, he won both the Second League of FBiH (West) in the 2013–14 season and the First League of FBiH in the 2015–16 season and promoted the club to the Bosnian Premier League.

Managerial career

Travnik
Bašić started his managerial career very early as a 27 year old. Back then he was caretaker manager of Travnik.

He was then named assistant manager of Travnik after Haris Jaganjac was named manager. After Jaganjac got sacked, Bašić stayed as the assistant manager, this time to Husnija Arapović. After Arapović left the club, on 28 June 2012, Bašić was named the new manager of Travnik.

In January 2013 he left Travnik, but only three months later, on 22 April 2013, Bašić was once again named Travnik season. In June 2013, Bašić again left Travnik after, this time, a successful season.

Metalleghe-BSI
On 29 November 2013, Bašić became the new manager of Metalleghe-BSI. In late May 2014, Bašić won the Second League of FBiH with Metalleghe and got them promoted to the 2014–15 First League of FBiH season.

In May 2016, Bašić with Metalleghe made history, winning the 2015–16 season of the First League of FBiH and getting promotion to the 2016–17 Bosnian Premier League season. On 8 November 2016, he left Metalleghe after a terrible start to the season.

Sloga Simin Han
On 8 January 2017, Bašić became the new manager of Sloga Simin Han. When he was appointed manager, Sloga was fighting to avoid relegation, whilst by the end of the season, they fought for the title and to get promoted to the Premier League. He left the club in June 2017.

Radomlje
On 16 June 2017, Bašić was named as the new manager of Slovenian Second League club Radomlje. With Radomlje he made a fantastic result in November 2018, as the club finished in 1st place after the autumn part of the 2018–19 Slovenian Second League season.

On 4 January 2019, during the winter break of the season, Bašić left Radomlje so that he could become the new manager of Slovenian PrvaLiga club Gorica.

Gorica
On 5 January 2019, Bašić was named as the new manager of Slovenian PrvaLiga club Gorica. He made his debut for Gorica as the club's manager in a 4–3 loss against Celje on 23 February 2019.

His first win as Gorica's manager came on 17 March 2019, in a 2–1 home win against Domžale.

After making a series of poor results, which culminated on 11 April 2019 with a 3–1 away lost against Aluminij, the next day on 12 April, Bašić got sacked.

Primeiro de Agosto
In June 2019, Bašić became a coach at Angolan first division club Primeiro de Agosto, on recommendations of the club's head coach Dragan Jović and assistant coach Nedžad Selimović.

Return to Tuzla City
On 19 October 2020, Bašić returned to Tuzla City (previously known as Sloga Simin Han), this time competing in the Bosnian Premier League, signing a contract with the club until December 2020 with an option to extend it. In his first game since his return to the club as a manager, he led his team to a 2020–21 Bosnian Cup second round win against Radnik Bijeljina. He suffered his first loss as Tuzla City manager on 28 November 2020, in a league match against Olimpik.

Managerial statistics

Honours

Manager
Metalleghe-BSI  
First League of FBiH: 2015–16
Second League of FBiH: 2013–14 (West)

References

External links

1983 births
Living people
People from Travnik
Bosnia and Herzegovina football managers
NK Travnik managers
NK Metalleghe-BSI managers
FK Tuzla City managers
NK Radomlje managers
ND Gorica managers
C.D. Primeiro de Agosto non-playing staff
Premier League of Bosnia and Herzegovina managers
Bosnia and Herzegovina expatriate football managers
Expatriate football managers in Slovenia
Bosnia and Herzegovina expatriate sportspeople in Slovenia